Eduardo Corral Gomez (28 October 1919 – 29 January 1972) was a U.S. Army veteran of the Korean War and a  recipient of the Medal of Honor for his actions during the Battle of Tabu-dong on 3 September 1950.

Biography
Gomez was born in Los Angeles, California on October 28, 1919, and enlisted in the U.S. Army on February 9, 1949.

His actions during his time of service in the Korean War resulted in his being posthumously awarded the Medal of Honor on March 18, 2014.

Medal of Honor
Gomez distinguished himself by defending his company as it was ruthlessly attacked by a hostile force, maneuvering across open ground to successfully assault a manned enemy tank. Wounded during his retreat from the tank, Gomez refused medical attention, instead manning his post and firing upon the enemy until his company formed a defensive perimeter.

The award came through the Defense Authorization Act which called for a review of Jewish American and Hispanic American veterans from World War II, the Korean War and the Vietnam War to ensure that no prejudice was shown to those deserving the Medal of Honor.

Medal of Honor citation
'''

Other honors and awards
In addition to receiving the Medal of Honor, Gomez received:
 Bronze Star Medal with one Bronze Oak Leaf Cluster and "V" Device
 Purple Heart with one Bronze Oak Leaf Cluster
 European-African-Middle Eastern Campaign Medal with one Bronze Service Star
 World War II Victory Medal
 Army of Occupation Medal with Germany Clasp
 National Defense Service Medal
 Combat Infantryman Badge
 Honorable Service Lapel Button-WWII
 Republic of Korea Presidential Unit Citation
 Gold Bravery Medal of Greece Unit Citation

See also

 List of Korean War Medal of Honor recipients

References

1919 births
1972 deaths
United States Army personnel of the Korean War
Korean War recipients of the Medal of Honor
United States Army Medal of Honor recipients
United States Army soldiers
American people of Mexican descent
People from Los Angeles